Herods Run is a stream in Upshur County, West Virginia, in the United States.

The name is probably biblical in origin.

See also
List of rivers of West Virginia

References

Rivers of Upshur County, West Virginia
Rivers of West Virginia